Copper(II) phosphate are inorganic compounds with the formula Cu3(PO4)2.n(H2O).  They can be regarded as the cupric salt of phosphoric acid.  Anhydrous copper(II) phosphate is a blue solid.  It is produced by a high-temperature reaction between diammonium phosphate and copper(II) oxide.
 2 (NH4)2HPO4 + 3 CuO → Cu3(PO4)2 + 3 H2O + 4 NH3

Structure
In terms of structure, copper(II) phosphates are coordination polymers, as is typical for most metal phosphates.  The phosphate center is tetrahedral. In the anhydrous material, the copper centers are pentacoordinate. In the monohydrate, the copper adopt 6-, 5-, and 4-coordinate geometries.

Minerals
It is relatively commonly encountered as the hydrated species Cu2(PO4)OH, which is green and occurs naturally as the mineral libethenite. Pseudomalachite, Cu5(PO4)2(OH)4, is the most common Cu phosphate in the nature, typical for some oxidation zones of Cu ore deposits.

References

External links
 Handbook of chemistry and physics http://www.hbcpnetbase.com/

Copper(II) compounds
Phosphates